Haralambie Corbu (15 February 1930 – 10 May 2021) was a professor and author from the Republic of Moldova. He was a member of the Academy of Sciences of Moldova. Corbu was decorated with Moldova's highest state decoration – the Order of the Republic.

Awards 
 Order of the Republic - highest state distinction
 "Om Emerit"

Honours 
 Primary School "Haralambie Corbu", Dubăsarii Vechi

Works
 "Alecsandri şi teatrul" (1963, 1973)
 Discursul direct. Aspecte ale publicisticii eminesciene (2000)
 Deschideri către valori (2003)
 Dincolo de mituri şi legende (2004)
 Constantin Stere şi timpul său (2005)
 Faţa ascunsă a cuvântului (2007)

Bibliography 
 Literatura și Arta Moldovei. Enciclopedie. Chişinău. Redacția Enciclopediei. 1986. Vol.1
 Valerian Ciobanu. Nume și Lume. Chişinău. Ed. Pontos., 2008

References

External links 
 Vocea Basarabiei, Satul Dubăsari Vechi a eternizat numele a două personalităţi ştiinţifice
 Haralambie Corbu la 80 de ani
 MEANDRELE ŞI ÎMPLINIRILE UNUI DESTIN. Academicianul HARALAMBIE CORBU LA 80 DE ANI

1930 births
2021 deaths
Moldova State University alumni
Moldovan journalists
Male journalists
Education in Moldova
Recipients of the Order of the Republic (Moldova)
Titular members of the Academy of Sciences of Moldova
People from Criuleni District
20th-century journalists
20th-century Moldovan writers
20th-century male writers
21st-century Moldovan writers
21st-century male writers
Moldovan male writers